The Egypt national rugby union team represents Egypt in rugby union. The national team was put together after the separation of the Arabian Gulf national rugby union team.

In September 2011, the under 20 Egyptian rugby national team traveled to Lebanon to play two matches against the Lebanon's national team. Egypt won both matches with scores of 51-5 and 14-10.

Record

Overall

References

African national rugby union teams
Rugby union in Egypt